Benaglio is an Italian surname. Notable people with the surname include:

Diego Benaglio (born 1983), Swiss footballer
Francesco Benaglio ( 1432–1492), Italian painter 
Girolamo Benaglio (15th century), Italian painter, relative of Francesco

Italian-language surnames